Alcides agathyrsus is a species of day-flying moth of the family Uraniidae. It is found from Indonesia to New Guinea. The butterfly Papilio laglaizei is a Batesian mimic of this moth.

References
 (in German) Original description: Kirsch, 1877. Beiträge zur Kenntniss der Lepidopteren-Fauna von Neu-Guinea

Lepidoptera of New Guinea
Uraniidae
Moths described in 1877